Lucie Chan (born 1975) is a visual artist born in Guyana, who is now based in Canada. Her artwork employs various techniques including large scale drawings and installation to examine issues of identity and race.

Biography 
Chan was born in Georgetown, Guyana and later moved to Halifax, Nova Scotia in Canada. Chan believes that she doesn't feel attached to any one culture, as she lived in Guyana then Canada, and is part Chinese, Black, East Indian and Portuguese cultures. Chan received a Bachelor of Fine Arts from the Alberta College of Art and Design and a Masters of Fine Arts from the Nova Scotia College of Art and Design in 2001. She lives and works in Vancouver, British Columbia, where she is an associate professor of drawing at Emily Carr University of Art and Design.

Awards
She was a nominee for the Sobey Art Award in 2010.

Exhibitions

Solo exhibitions 
 2022  – How to be 57 (Oxygen Art Centre, Nelson, BC)
 2020 – To Be Free, Everything You Most Hate and Fear (Centre A, Vancouver, BC)
 2018 – How to Be 57 (Kitchener Waterloo Art Gallery, Kitchener, Ontario)
 2001 – Mek Back Shaky Baby Mek Back (Anna Leonowens Gallery, Nova Scotia College of Art and Design, Halifax, Nova Scotia)
 2002 – Something to Carry (Mount Saint Vincent Art Gallery, Halifax, Nova Scotia)
 2006 – tears, and in Between (Foreman Art Gallery of Bishop's University, Sherbrooke, Quebec)
 2007 – Lucie Chan: Between, and in tears, Art Gallery of Nova Scotia.

Group exhibitions 
Lucie Chan work was exhibited in a 3-person exhibition Drawn Positions: Geographies and Communities at the National Gallery of Canada in 2008.

Chan and Marigold Santos collaborated to create the artist exhibition Attachments, which was shown at the Richmond Art Gallery in 2014. Her works were part of Assemble in Art Gallery of Sudbury in 2016.

Curatorship 
Lucie Chan was one of the curators of 2017 Nocturne Festival, held annually in Nova Scotia.

References 

Canadian installation artists
Canadian women artists
Living people
Guyanese emigrants to Canada
1975 births